Tristan Valentin (born 23 February 1982 in Le Blanc-Mesnil, Seine-Saint-Denis) is a French professional road bicycle racer, who last rode for the  team.

Doping
Valentin tested positive for Heptaminol on 6 June 2006. The UCI summary of 'Decisions on Anti-Doping Rule Violations made in 2006' states "disqualification and ineligibility for 6 months". However, the positive result was blamed on a medicine that the team doctor prescribed for varicose veins.

Career achievements

Major results

2005
 1st, Tro-Bro Léon
 1st, Prix de la Ville de Nogent-sur-Oise
2006
 3rd, Trophée des Grimpeurs
2013
 7th Overall, World Ports Classic

Grand Tour general classification results timeline

See also
 List of doping cases in cycling

References

External links
Profile at Cofidis official website 
Fan club 

1982 births
Living people
People from Le Blanc-Mesnil
French male cyclists
Doping cases in cycling
French sportspeople in doping cases
Sportspeople from Seine-Saint-Denis
Cyclists from Île-de-France